The 2021 Slovak Cup Final (known as the Slovnaft Cup for sponsorship reasons) was the final match of the 2020–21 Slovak Cup, the 52nd season of the top cup competition in Slovak football. The match was played at the Tehelné pole in Bratislava, on 19 May 2021, contested by MŠK Žilina and ŠK Slovan Bratislava.

Teams
In the following table, finals until 1993 were in the Czechoslovak era, since 1994 were in the Slovak era.

Road to the final
Note: In all results below, the score of the finalist is given first (H: home; A: away; N: neutral venue).

Match

Details
Although the match was played at the home stadium of Slovan Bratislava, "home" team (for administrative purposes) had been determined by an additional draw held after the semi-finals.

See also
 2020–21 Slovak Cup
 2021–22 UEFA Europa Conference League

Notes

References

Slovak Cup Finals
2020–21 in Slovak football
MŠK Žilina matches
ŠK Slovan Bratislava matches